Sic Alps is the eponymous fifth studio album by American rock band Sic Alps. The album has been described to have more of a plot than any of their previous albums

Track listing

References

Drag City (record label) albums
Sic Alps albums
2012 albums